Karin Derry is an American politician. She is a Democrat who represented the 39th district in the Iowa House of Representatives from 2018 to 2020.

Early life
Derry holds a Bachelor of Arts degree from the University of Iowa, an MPA from Drake University, and a JD from Drake University School of Law.

Political career
In 2018, Derry ran against Republican incumbent Jake Highfill to represent District 39 in the Iowa House of Representatives, and won. In the 2020 election, she was defeated by Republican candidate Eddie Andrews.

Derry sat on the following standing committees:
 Human Resources
 Judiciary
 State Government

She was also the ranking member on the Administration and Regulation Appropriations Subcommittee.

Electoral record

References

Living people
Democratic Party members of the Iowa House of Representatives
Year of birth missing (living people)
21st-century American politicians